Wolfgang Schmidt may refer to:

 Wolfgang Schmidt (athlete) (born 1954), German track and field athlete
 Wolfgang Schmidt (politician), (born 1970) German politician
 Wolfgang M. Schmidt (born 1933), Austrian mathematician
 Wolfgang Schmidt, birth name of Beate Schmidt, German serial killer